Anabel Medina Garrigues and Klára Koukalová (formerly Zakopalová) were the defending champions, but they chose not to participate. 
Andreja Klepač and María Teresa Torró Flor won the title, defeating Jocelyn Rae and Anna Smith in the final, 6–1, 6–1.

Seeds

Draw

External Links
 Main Draw

Swedish Open - Doubles
2014 Women's Doubles
2014 in Swedish women's sport